The Portland First Ward Meetinghouse, also referred to as the Portland Stake Tabernacle, is a historic church building in the Richmond neighborhood of Portland, Oregon. Built in 1929, it was used as a meetinghouse for members of the Church of Jesus Christ of Latter-day Saints until 2019 and is currently used as a Family History Center, providing Genealogy resources to the public.

The Meetinghouse seats over 2,000

Gallery

See also 

 The Church of Jesus Christ of Latter-day Saints in Oregon
 Religion in Portland, Oregon

References 

Churches in Oregon
Richmond, Portland, Oregon
Tabernacles (LDS Church)